Being Human is a 1994 comedy-drama film written and directed by Bill Forsyth and starring Robin Williams, John Turturro, Bill Nighy, Vincent D'Onofrio, Robert Carlyle, Theresa Russell and Ewan McGregor in his feature-film debut. An international co-production of the United Kingdom and Japan, the film portrays the experience of a single human soul, portrayed by Williams, through various incarnations. Williams is the only common actor throughout the stories that span man's history on Earth.

An attempt on director-screenwriter Bill Forsyth's part to depict by visual means the ordinariness of life throughout the ages, Being Human is deliberately slow in its pace in order to emphasize how slow life often is. The structure is one of vignette-like character studies of one man (actually at least four distinct men, all with the same soul) who keeps making the same relationships and mistakes throughout his lifetimes.

Plot 
In the first incarnation, which appears to be a caveman, a man's family is taken from him by raiders due to his cowardice and hesitation. Before his wife is taken away, she says, "Don't lose the children!"

The next incarnation is in Ancient Rome in which he, Hector, is a slave to a "foolish master" who loses his fortune and is compelled to kill himself by his creditors and orders Hector to join him. Hector longs to be free to find the children and wife he had before he became a slave, but he has fallen in love with another slave and forgets his waiting family.

Third incarnation: He is a Scottish crusader on his way home to his children.  The master from his life in Rome as a slave is now a crusader trying to decide whether to become a priest. They travel together until Hector finds his soul mate from the life in Rome. She is a widow and wishes Hector to join her family, but his duties to the children in Scotland pull at him.

Fourth incarnation: Hector is finally forced to confront his capacity for cowardly indecision. He is a Portuguese man in The Renaissance shipwrecked on the coast of Africa. He is the master in this life, his wife from the first incarnation shipwrecked with him as his spurned lover, and the raider who spirited her away is her steadfast friend.

Fifth incarnation: He is a modern man in New York, paying the consequences of cowardly indecision and gaining the strength to address the children he lost lifetimes ago. He is joined in this life by his master/slave/friend/soul mate, and former wife Janet and her husband/raider from lifetimes past. They support him but are people who are trying to find their own way, just as in the past lives.

Cast

Production
The film had a very problematic production, mainly down to monetary issues and the ambition of Forsyth's screenplay. Later, after poor test screenings, Warner Bros. instructed Bill Forsyth to trim 40 minutes from the film, as well as add narration and a happy ending. Forsyth subsequently disowned the film.

Reception

Critical reception
Despite the changes, the film was still not well-received on release. On Rotten Tomatoes the film has a 54% rating based on 13 reviews. 
Owen Gleiberman of Entertainment Weekly gave the film an 'F' and said that the film "demonstrates what can happen when a director with a gossamer comic touch tries to become commercial—the movie is so flat and banal it's like a Mel Brooks parody in which someone forgot to put in the jokes." Janet Maslin of The New York Times was more positive, declaring "Aiming high and falling short of his own mark, Mr. Forsyth remains a film maker of vivid, unpredictable imagination."

Box office
The film was one of the worst performing films of the year, grossing just $5 million against its $40 million cost. It grossed $1.5 million in the United States and Canada.

Year-end worst-of lists 
 3rd – Glenn Lovell, San Jose Mercury News
 Top 4 (not ranked) – Stephen Hunter, The Baltimore Sun
 Stars with Multiple Roles in the Same Movies – Siskel & Ebert

References

External links
 
 
 

1994 films
Warner Bros. films
1990s English-language films
Scottish Gaelic-language films
1994 comedy-drama films
Films shot at Pinewood Studios
Films about reincarnation
British comedy-drama films
Japanese comedy-drama films
Films directed by Bill Forsyth
Films produced by David Puttnam
1990s British films
1990s Japanese films